Oleksandr Oleksandrovych Omelchenko (9 August 1938 – 25 November 2021) was a Ukrainian politician who served as mayor of Kyiv, the capital of Ukraine, first elected in 1999. Running for a third term he lost his re-election bid in March 2006. Omelchenko was also a People's Deputy of Ukraine from 2007 to 2012.

Omelchenko was the President of both the Association of the Cities of Ukraine and the Ice Hockey Federation of Ukraine (1997–2006). In 2001, he bought FC CSKA Kyiv from the Ministry of Defense and transformed it into FC Arsenal Kyiv.

Omelchenko died on 25 November 2021, aged 83, after being infected with COVID-19 which caused a lesion of the lungs. From 2014 until his death he was a member of the Kyiv City Council.

Early life
Oleksandr Omelchenko was born on 9 August 1938, in Vinnytsia Oblast. His highest degree in the Soviet university education system was Candidate of Sciences. After graduation, Omelchenko worked at Kyivmiskbud, where he rose from worker to director of the plant of reinforced concrete structures.

He also became the chief engineer of the construction plant and the first deputy chairman of Kyivmiskbud. Omelchenko worked in Afghanistan during the Soviet–Afghan War in 1987–1989.

Political career 
After 1989, Omelchenko worked in the system of state construction, he was deputy chairman of the executive committee of the Kyiv City Council, and held the position of general director of Kyivrekonstruktsiya.

In 1994–1996, Omelchenko was the first deputy chairman of the Kyiv City State Administration. In August 1996, he headed this body.

Mayor of Kyiv 
During the 1999 Kyiv mayoral election, Omelchenko defeated noted oligarch Hryhoriy Surkis, with 76 percent of the vote to Surkis's 16 percent. Omelchenko became the first elected mayor in Ukraine's modern history, with a platform highlighting his work in restoring much of Kyiv's historic buildings and renovating parts of downtown Kyiv.

On recordings, which were termed the "Second Cassette Scandal" and released in early January 2002, Omelchenko demonstrably urged Viktor Yushchenko to have the Yushchenko-led Our Ukraine bloc and the Omelchenko-led Unity bloc oust Viktor Medvedchuk as first vice speaker of the Rada. On 13 December 2001, Medvedchuk was ousted. The recordings revealed that Omelchenko virulently opposed Medvedchuk and the Medvedchuk led SDPU(o), which supported Leonid Kuchma.

Omelchenko was a candidate in the 2004 Ukrainian presidential election, nominated by the Unity Party, which he formerly chaired. Omelchenko was the only candidate for President whose son was a deputy in the Verkhovna Rada. His program included the urgent withdrawal of Ukrainian forces from Iraq. In the election, he received 0.48% of the vote. 

While he was running for a third term as Mayor of Kyiv in what was expected to be an easy victory in the March 2006 election, he was soundly defeated, with 21% of the votes behind elected mayor Leonid Chernovetsky and Vitali Klitschko, who would himself later become mayor of Kyiv.

Later political career 
During the 2007 Ukrainian parliamentary election, Omelchenko was elected as an Our Ukraine–People's Self-Defense Bloc deputy to the Verkhovna Rada. However, he was expelled from the party in September 2011 due to his support of the Azarov Government. Omelchenko proceeded to voluntarily leave the faction the next month. Omelchenko's son, also named Oleksandr, was also a member of the Verkhovna Rada on an Our Ukraine ticket from 2002 until 2007.

During the 2008 Kyiv local election, Omelchenko was again a candidate for the post of Mayor of Kyiv, but he only garnered 2.53% of the vote, placing sixth behind incumbent mayor Leonid Chernovetsky. His Oleksandr Omelchenko Bloc won only 2.26% of the vote, and no seats in the Kyiv City Council.

In the 2012 parliamentary elections, Omelchenko at first intended to attempt to be re-elected into parliament in single-member districts number 220 situated in Kyiv; but he withdrew from the elections.

During the 2014 Kyiv local election, Omelchenko was again a candidate for the post of Mayor of Kyiv, again as a candidate of the Unity Party. He finished 4th in this election with 6.1% of the votes (winner Vitali Klitschko received 56.7%). Unity won 3.3% of the votes and 2 seats in the Kyiv City Council; including a seat for Omelchenko.

Omelchenko did not participate in the 2014 Ukrainian parliamentary election.

In the 2019 Ukrainian parliamentary election, Omelchenko was a candidate of the Unity Party in single-member district No. 220, located in Kyiv. He took the fifth place in his constituency, gaining 8.28% of the vote.

In the 2020 Kyiv local election, Omelchenko was again candidate for mayor of Kyiv, nominated by Unity of Oleksandr Omelchenko. In this election, the party was the third most popular party of Kyiv, winning 14 seats, and Omelchenko returned to the Kyiv City Council. However, he lost the mayoral election to Vitali Klitschko with 50.52% of the votes. Omelchenko finished in eighth place.

Death 
On 18 November 2021, Omelchenko was admitted to hospital after being infected with COVID-19 that had caused a lesion of the lungs. Omelchenko died on 25 November 2021, aged 83.

Honours and awards
 Hero of Ukraine (21 August 2001) for outstanding personal contribution to the Ukrainian state in the socio-economic and cultural development of the capital of Ukraine
 Order of the Badge of Honour (1982)
 Order of the Red Banner of Labour (1986)
 Order of Prince Yaroslav the Wise, 3rd (2006), 4th (1999) and 5th (1998) classes
 Honour of the President of Ukraine (1996)
 Honoured Builder of Ukraine
 Knight Commander, Order of St. Gregory the Great (2001)
 Honorary doctorate of Kyiv-Mohyla Academy (2001)

See also
 Legal status and local government of Kyiv
 List of mayors of Kyiv

Notes

References

External links
 Oleksandr Omelchenko Bloc official website

1938 births
2021 deaths
Candidates in the 2004 Ukrainian presidential election
FC Arsenal Kyiv
Governors of Kyiv
Grand Officers of the Order of Prince Henry
Ukrainian ice hockey people
Kyiv National Economic University alumni
Mayors of Kyiv
Our Ukraine (political party) politicians
People from Vinnytsia Oblast
Recipients of the Order of Prince Yaroslav the Wise, 3rd class
Recipients of the Order of State
Recipients of the title of Hero of Ukraine
Sixth convocation members of the Verkhovna Rada
Ukrainian sports executives and administrators
Unity (Ukraine) politicians
Deaths from the COVID-19 pandemic in Ukraine
Laureates of the State Prize of Ukraine in the Field of Architecture
Burials at Baikove Cemetery